Bilochpura, also known as Balochpura, is a hamlet in the Indian state of Uttar Pradesh. It is home to approximately 8,000 people of the Balochi ethnic group.

History 
Balochpura is home to approximately 8,000 people of the Balochi ethnic group. The ancestors of these individuals were from Balochistan and were employed as artillerymen in the army of Mughal Indian emperor Babur during the time of the First Battle of Panipat in 1526. They decided to remain in the area, which was named after their homeland, after "the Balochis fell in love with the plush landscape of the Gangetic plain and chose to settle down on the banks of the Yamuna."

The city of Bilochpura has been awarded the title of 'Kranti Gram' by the Government of India as its residents "fought in the army of the last Mughal Emperor Bahadurshah Zafar against the British."

In 2018, Balochi separatist leader Mazdak Dilshad Baloch visited Bilochpura with his wife to gather support from the Balochi Indian residents of the village.

References 

Cities and towns in Bagpat district
Baloch diaspora in India